Take My Body Close is a song written by Mathias Kallenberger and Anders Berlin, and recorded by Velvet and released as a single in 2008, and also appearing on her 2009 album The Queen. The single peaked at eight position at the Swedish singles chart.

Charts

References

2008 singles
English-language Swedish songs
2008 songs